Francisco Javier 'Fran' Miranda Mera (born 27 March 1988 in Badajoz, Extremadura) is a Spanish footballer who plays for CD Alcoyano as a midfielder.

External links

1988 births
Living people
Sportspeople from Badajoz
Spanish footballers
Footballers from Extremadura
Association football midfielders
Segunda División players
Segunda División B players
Tercera División players
AD Cerro de Reyes players
CD Badajoz players
Mérida UD footballers
CD Alcoyano footballers
RCD Espanyol B footballers
UD Melilla footballers
Real Jaén footballers
Extremadura UD footballers
Hércules CF players
Gimnàstic de Tarragona footballers